Embarrass Township may refer to the following townships in the United States:

 Embarrass Township, Edgar County, Illinois
 Embarrass Township, St. Louis County, Minnesota